The 2021 UCI Para-cycling Road World Championships is the World Championships for road cycling for athletes with a physical disability. The Championships took place in Cascais in Portugal from 9 to 13 June 2021.

Medalists

Medal table

Participating nations
39 nations participated.

References

External links
Official website
Results
Results book

UCI Para-cycling Road World Championships
UCI Para-cycling Road World Championships
UCI Para-cycling Road World Championships
International cycle races hosted by Portugal
UCI